Wildstorm: Revelations is a comic book limited series, written by Scott Beatty and Christos Gage with art by Wes Craig.

After "Wildcats: Armageddon", Nemesis recruits Savant and Backlash to help her try to stop the end of the world.

Revelations was the start of a number bi-weekly series, and was followed by Number of the Beast, which resulted in the relaunch of a number of Wildstorm titles.

Collected editions
The series was brought together into a trade paperback:

 Wildstorm: Revelations (144 pages, July 2008, Titan Books, Wildstorm)

Notes

References

External links
Gage & Beatty on Wildstorm: Revelations, Newsarama, January 4, 2008
Scott Beatty: Exploring The Wildstorm Universe, Newsarama, February 13, 2008
Previews of #1, #2 and #3

2008 comics debuts
WildStorm limited series